Blood, Sweat and Towers is the debut album of English punk rock band Towers of London, released on 5 June 2006. The album features thirteen tracks, four of which have been released in the United Kingdom as singles.

The album was heavily influenced by Sex Pistols' Never Mind the Bollocks and Guns N' Roses' Appetite for Destruction. Sonically, the songs contained on Blood, Sweat and Towers are played in a loose punk rock style.

The song "Fuck It Up" features on the album twice: one version is an acoustic rendition, while the other is a version by the full band, which was previously released as a single in 2005. It is one of only six UK top 50 singles to have the word "fuck" in the title.

Blood, Sweat and Towers was released on three different dates, depending on location;
Germany, Austria and Switzerland – May 26, 2006
England – June 5, 2006
United States – August 1, 2006

Track listing
"I'm a Rat" (New Air Raid Intro)
"Air Guitar"
"Kill the Popscene"
"Beaujolais"
"Fuck It Up" (Acoustic)
"King"
"Good Times"
"On a Noose"
"Start Believing"
"Northern Lights"
"I Lose It" (US & Canada Only)
"Fuck It Up" (Band)
"How Rude She Was"
"Son of A Preacher" (US & Canada Only)
"Seen It All"
T.V. (Japan Only)
City of Hell (Japan Only)

Personnel
Tower of London
 Donny Tourette – vocals
 Dirk Tourette – rhythm guitar
 The Rev – lead guitar
 Tommy Brunette – bass guitar
 Snell – drums

Technical personnel
 Stacey Jones, Bill Lefler – producers

References

2006 debut albums
Towers of London albums
TVT Records albums